Devica (Serbian Cyrillic: Девица) is a mountain in eastern Serbia, near the town of Sokobanja. It belongs to the boundary of Carpathian and Balkan mountain ranges, which meet in eastern Serbia.

It is bounded by the spa town on Sokobanja and river Moravica on north, Labukovo on south, road Sokobanja-Labukovo on west, and Galibabinac on east. The deep canyon of Moravica is cut into Devica's northern edge, dominated by the old fortress Soko Grad. At the height of around 1100 m there is a large plateau, with several caves and other carst formations. Except for parts near Sokobanja, it has no tourist facilities and is relatively unknown to the wider public.

References

Mountains of Serbia
Serbian Carpathians